The 1973 Davis Cup was the 62nd edition of the Davis Cup, the most important tournament between national teams in men's tennis. 53 teams entered the competition, 31 in the Europe Zone, 12 in the Americas Zone, and 10 in the Eastern Zone.

For the first time, preliminary rounds were used in every zone, effectively giving byes through the first two rounds of competition to the previous year's finalists from the American and Eastern zones, and to the previous year's semifinalists from the European zones. This year's competition also marked the first time that professional tennis players were allowed to compete.

The United States defeated Chile in the Americas Inter-Zonal final, Australia defeated India in the Eastern Zone final, and Czechoslovakia and Romania were the winners of the two Europe Zones, defeating the Soviet Union and Italy respectively.

In the Inter-Zonal Zone, Australia defeated Czechoslovakia and the United States defeated Romania in the semifinals. Australia then defeated the United States in the final, breaking the defending champions' 5-year winning run. The final was held at the Public Auditorium in Cleveland, Ohio, United States on 30 November-2 December. It marked the first time that the final was held indoors.

Americas Zone

North & Central America Zone

Preliminary rounds

Main Draw

South America Zone

Preliminary rounds

Main Draw

Americas Inter-Zonal Final
United States vs. Chile

The doubles match between Smith/van Dillen and Cornejo/Fillol set the Davis Cup record for the most games in a doubles rubber (122). The second set, which went to 37-39, set the record for the most games played in a set (76).

Eastern Zone

Final
India vs. Australia

Europe Zone

Zone A

Preliminary round

Main Draw

Final
Romania vs. Soviet Union

Zone B

Preliminary round

Main Draw

Final
Czechoslovakia vs. Italy

Inter-Zonal Zone

Draw

Semifinals
Australia vs. Czechoslovakia

United States vs. Romania

Final
United States vs. Australia

References

External links
Davis Cup Official Website

 
Davis Cups by year
Davis Cup
Davis Cup
Davis Cup
Davis Cup
Davis Cup
Davis Cup